The 2010–11 Wisconsin Badgers men's ice hockey season is the team's 58th season and their 52nd season as a member of the Western Collegiate Hockey Association. They represent the University of Wisconsin–Madison in the 2010–11 NCAA Division I men's ice hockey season. The team is coached by Mike Eaves, and they play their home games at Kohl Center.

Regular season

Standings

Schedule and results
  Green background indicates win (2 points).
  Red background indicates loss (0 points).
  White background indicates tie (1 point).

|- align="center" bgcolor="#ffcccc"
| 1†* || October 8 || Boston University || 4–3 || Wisconsin || || Gudmandson || 4,000 || 0–0–0 || 0–1–0 || 
|- align="center" bgcolor="#ccffcc"
| 2†* || October 10 || Wisconsin || 6–0 || Holy Cross || || Bennett || 2,014 || 0–0–0 || 1–1–0 || 
|- align="center" bgcolor="#ccffcc"
| 3† || October 15 || Alabama–Huntsville || 0-7 || Wisconsin || || Gudmandson || 10,769 || 0–0–0 || 2–1–0 || 
|- align="center" bgcolor="#ccffcc"
| 4† || October 17 || Alabama–Huntsville || 2-5 || Wisconsin || || Bennett || 11,731 || 0–0–0 || 3–1–0 || 
|- align="center" bgcolor="#ffcccc"
| 5 || October 22 || Wisconsin || 2–4 || Denver || || Gudmandson || 5,328 || 0-1-0 || 3–2–0 || 
|- align="center" bgcolor="#ffffff"
| 6 || October 23 || Wisconsin || 2–2 || Denver || OT || Gudmandson || 5,905 || 0–1–1 || 3–2–1 || 
|- align="center" bgcolor="#ccffcc"
| 7 || October 29 || Michigan Tech || 2–5 || Wisconsin || || Gudmandson || 11,295 || 1–1–1 || 4–2–1 || 
|- align="center" bgcolor="#ccffcc"
| 8 || October 30 || Michigan Tech || 1–4 || Wisconsin || || Bennett || 12,690 || 2–1–1 || 5–2–1 || 
|-

|- align="center" bgcolor="#ccffcc"
| 9 || November 5 || Wisconsin || 6–0 || Minnesota || || Gudmandson || 9,689 || 3–1–1 || 6–2–1 || 
|- align="center" bgcolor=white
| 10 || November 6 || Wisconsin || 3–3 || Minnesota || OT || Bennett || 9,913 || 3–1–2 || 6–2–2 || 
|- align="center" bgcolor="#ffcccc"
| 11 || November 12 || North Dakota || 1-0 || Wisconsin || || Gudmandson || 13,601 || 3-2-2 || 6-3-2 || 
|- align="center" bgcolor="#ffcccc"
| 12 || November 13 || North Dakota || 4-2 || Wisconsin || || Gudmandson || 15,325 || 3-3-2 || 6-4-2 || 
|- align="center" bgcolor="#ffcccc"
| 13 || November 19 || Minnesota–Duluth || 6-5 || Wisconsin || OT || Bennett || 11,125 || 3-4-2 || 6-5-2 || 
|- align="center" bgcolor="#ffcccc"
| 14 || November 20 || Minnesota–Duluth || 3-2 || Wisconsin || OT || Bennett || 13,163 || 3-5-2 || 6-6-2 || 
|- align="center" bgcolor="#ffffff"
| 15†¤ || November 26 || Michigan || 4-4 || Wisconsin || OT || Bennett || 12,820 || 3-5-2 || 6-6-3 || 
|- align="center" bgcolor="#ccffcc"
| 16†¤ || November 27 || Michigan State || 1-4 || Wisconsin || || Gudmandson || 14,012 || 3-5-2 || 7-6-3 || 
|-

|- align="center" bgcolor="#ffcccc"
| 17 || December 3 || Wisconsin || 1-2 || Alaska-Anchorage || || Gudmandson || 2,765 || 3-6-2 || 7-7-3 || 
|- align="center" bgcolor="#ccffcc"
| 18 || December 4 || Wisconsin || 3-1 || Alaska-Anchorage || || Gudmandson || 3,154 || 4-6-2 || 8-7-3 || 
|- align="center" bgcolor="#ccffcc"
| 19 || December 10 || Bemidji State || 2-3 || Wisconsin || || Gudmandson || 11,358 || 5-6-2 || 9-7-3 || 
|- align="center" bgcolor="#ccffcc"
| 20 || December 11 || Bemidji State || 0-2 || Wisconsin || || Gudmandson || 12,757 || 6-6-2 || 10-7-3 || 
|- align="center" bgcolor="#ccffcc"
| 21† || December 30 || Massachusetts || 1-5 || Wisconsin || || Gudmandson || 13,171 || 6-6-2 || 11-7-3 || 
|- align="center" bgcolor="#ccffcc"
| 22† || December 31 || Massachusetts || 2-4 || Wisconsin || || Gudmandson || 13,341 || 6-6-2 || 12-7-3 || 
|-

|- align="center" bgcolor="#ccffcc"
| 23† || January 7 || Canisius || 0-3 || Wisconsin || || Gudmandson || 12,791 || 6-6-2 || 13-7-3 || 
|- align="center" bgcolor="#ccffcc"
| 24† || January 8 || Canisius || 5-6 || Wisconsin || OT || Bennett || 13,201 || 6-6-2 || 14-7-3 || 
|- align="center" bgcolor="#ffcccc"
| 25 || January 14 || Wisconsin || 0-2 || Minnesota–Duluth || || Gudmandson || 6,405 || 6-7-2 || 14-8-3 || 
|- align="center" bgcolor="#ccffcc"
| 26 || January 15 || Wisconsin || 3-2 || Minnesota–Duluth || || Gudmandson || 6,668 || 7-7-2 || 15-8-3 || 
|- align="center" bgcolor="#ccffcc"
| 27 || January 21 || Minnesota State || 2-3 || Wisconsin || || Gudmandson || 14,037 || 8-7-2 || 16-8-3 || 
|- align="center" bgcolor="#ccffcc"
| 28 || January 22 || Minnesota State || 1-2 || Wisconsin || || Gudmandson || 15,325 || 9-7-2 || 17-8-3 || 
|- align="center" bgcolor="#ccffcc"
| 29 || January 28 || Wisconsin || 4-2 || Michigan Tech || || Gudmandson || 2,211 || 10-7-2 || 18-8-3 || 
|- align="center" bgcolor="#ccffcc"
| 30 || January 29 || Wisconsin || 4-1 || Michigan Tech || || Bennett || 2,331 || 11-7-2 || 19-8-3 || 
|-

|- align="center" bgcolor="#ffcccc"
| 31 || February 11 || Wisconsin || 1-4 || Nebraska–Omaha || || Gudmandson || 15,137 || 11-8-2 || 19-9-3 || 
|- align="center" bgcolor="#ffcccc"
| 32 || February 12 || Wisconsin || 3-4 || Nebraska–Omaha || || Gudmandson || 10,111 || 11-9-2 || 19-10-3 || 
|- align="center" bgcolor="#ffcccc"
| 33 || February 18 || Minnesota || 5-2 || Wisconsin || || Gudmandson || 14,315 || 11-10-2 || 19-11-3 || 
|- align="center" bgcolor="#ffffff"
| 34 || February 19 || Minnesota || 3-3 || Wisconsin || || Bennett || 15,325 || 11-10-3 || 19-11-4 || 
|- align="center" bgcolor="#ffcccc"
| 35 || February 25 || Wisconsin || 2-4 || St. Cloud State || || Bennett || 5,982 || 11-11-3 || 19-12-4 || 
|- align="center" bgcolor="#ffcccc"
| 36 || February 26 || Wisconsin || 3-7 || St. Cloud State || || Gudmandson || 5,992 || 11-12-3 || 19-13-4 || 
|-

|- align="center" bgcolor="#ffcccc"
| 37 || March 4 || Colorado College || 3-2 || Wisconsin || || Bennett || 13,493 || 11-13-3 || 19-14-4 || 
|- align="center" bgcolor="#ccffcc"
| 38 || March 5 || Colorado College || 1-3 || Wisconsin || || Gudmandson || 15,325 || 12-13-3 || 20-14-4 || 
|- align="center" bgcolor="#ccffcc"
| 39†‡ || March 11 || Wisconsin || 3-1 || Colorado College || || Gudmandson || 6,341 || 12-13-3 || 21-14-4 || 
|- align="center" bgcolor="#ffcccc"
| 40†‡ || March 12 || Wisconsin || 3-4 || Colorado College || OT || Gudmandson || 6,652 || 12-13-3 || 21-15-4 || 
|- align="center" bgcolor="#ffcccc"
| 41†‡ || March 13 || Wisconsin || 1-2 || Colorado College || || Bennett || 5,451 || 12-13-3 || 21-16-4 || 
|-

|-
| style="font-size:88%"|† Non-conference game* Warrior Ice Breaker Tournament¤ College Hockey Showcase‡ 2011 WCHA Men's Ice Hockey Tournament first-round game

Player stats

Skaters
Note: GP = Games played; G = Goals; A = Assists; Pts = Points; +/- = Plus/minus; PIM = Penalty minutes

Goaltenders
Note: GP = Games played; W = Wins; L = Losses; T = Ties; Win% = Winning percentage; GA = Goals against; MIN = Minutes played; GAA = Goals against average; SHO = Shutouts; SV% = Save percentage; SV = Saves; G = Goals; A = Assists; PIM = Penalty minutes

See also
2010–11 Wisconsin Badgers women's ice hockey season

External links
 Wisconsin Badgers men's ice hockey

Wisconsin
Wisconsin Badgers men's ice hockey seasons
Wiscon
Wiscon